The Secretary of State for Employment was a position in the Cabinet of the United Kingdom.  In 1995 it was merged with Secretary of State for Education to make the Secretary of State for Education and Employment.  In 2001 the employment functions were hived off and transferred to the Secretary of State for Work and Pensions.

Minister of Labour (1916–1940)

Minister of Labour and National Service (1940–1959)

Minister of Labour (1959–1968)

Secretary of State for Employment and Productivity (1968–1970)

Secretary of State for Employment (1970–1995)

Secretary of State for Education and Employment (1995–2001) 

The office was merged with the Department of Social Security to form the Department for Work & Pensions in 2001.

Employment
Defunct ministerial offices in the United Kingdom